Steve Uzelac (born 12 March 1953) is an English former footballer who played in the Football League for Doncaster Rovers, Mansfield Town, Preston North End and Stockport County.

References

External links
 

English footballers
English Football League players
1953 births
Living people
Doncaster Rovers F.C. players
Mansfield Town F.C. players
Preston North End F.C. players
Stockport County F.C. players
Association football defenders